Ivor Pandur (born 25 March 2000) is a Croatian professional footballer who plays as a goalkeeper for Dutch club Fortuna Sittard on loan from Hellas Verona in the Serie A.

Club career
Pandur made his professional debut for Rijeka in October 2019 in a Cup tie against Buje. He then made his league debut on 14 December 2019, playing the full 90 minutes of a 3–1 victory over Varaždin.

On 31 August 2020, Pandur signed with Italian Serie A club Hellas Verona a five-year contract. He made his debut on 28 October in a Coppa Italia tie with Venezia that ended 3–3 after extra time, with Verona progressing thanks to Pandur saving two penalties in the shoot-out. He made his league debut on 9 May 2021 in a 1–1 draw with Torino.

On 7 July 2022, Pandur was loaned to Fortuna Sittard in the Netherlands.

International career 
He has been capped for various Croatian youth national teams.

References

External links
 

2000 births
Living people
Footballers from Rijeka
Association football goalkeepers
Croatian footballers
Croatia youth international footballers
Croatia under-21 international footballers
HNK Rijeka players
Hellas Verona F.C. players
Fortuna Sittard players
Croatian Football League players
Serie A players
Eredivisie players
Croatian expatriate footballers
Croatian expatriate sportspeople in Italy
Expatriate footballers in Italy
Croatian expatriate sportspeople in the Netherlands
Expatriate footballers in the Netherlands